Sir Richard Pearson (1731–1806) was a British naval officer who was captain of the ship HMS Serapis during the American Revolution.

As a lieutenant in the East Indies he did well during the Seven Years' War, where he was severely wounded. He was subsequently unable to obtain a commission because his senior officers twice died before they could fulfil their promises. He finally obtained post rank as a captain in 1773.

In 1779, in command of the Serapis, 44 guns, and escorting a large convoy from the Baltic, he was attacked off Flamborough Head by an American rebel squadron under John Paul Jones in the Bonhomme Richard, 42 guns. This famous action ended in Pearson surrendering the Serapis to Jones but not before his spirited defence had covered the escape of the valuable convoy. The Bonhomme Richard ended up sinking following the capture, forcing Jones to lose his own ship and return to port in Pearson's captured vessel.

Pearson was considered a hero in his homeland after the battle. He was knighted, received presents from the merchants and the freedoms of several towns.  John Paul Jones was later asked how he felt about the captain whom he had defeated in battle being knighted, and he reportedly said: "I'd like to meet him on the high seas again; I'll make him a lord!"

Pearson's 2nd son was Henry Shepherd Pearson who was Governor of Penang in 1808.

In film
Pearson was portrayed by Peter Cushing in the film John Paul Jones (1959).

References

External links
 
Portrait of Sir Richard Pearson

1731 births
1806 deaths
Royal Navy personnel of the American Revolutionary War
Royal Navy officers